The Midway River is an  river located in southern Saint Louis County and northeast Carlton County, Minnesota, United States.  It is a tributary of the Saint Louis River and flows northeast to southwest.  The Midway River rises in the central part of Hermantown, then flows through Midway Township and Thomson Township, before flowing into the Saint Louis River southeast of Cloquet.

Midway River was named from the fact it lies at the midpoint between Fond du Lac and a series of falls on the St. Louis River.

See also
 List of rivers of Minnesota

References

Minnesota Watersheds
USGS Hydrologic Unit Map - State of Minnesota (1974)

Rivers of Minnesota
Rivers of St. Louis County, Minnesota
Rivers of Carlton County, Minnesota